Mark Lidzbarski (born Abraham Mordechai Lidzbarski, Płock, Russian Empire, 7 January 1868 – Göttingen, 13 November 1928) was a Polish philologist, Semitist and translator of Mandaean texts.

Early life and education
Lidzbarski was born in Russian Poland to a Hasidic Eastern Jewish family, and from 1889 to 1892 studied Semitic philology in Berlin. There he converted to evangelical Christianity and changed his first name to "Mark". In February 1896, he received his doctorate in Middle Eastern Studies at the University of Kiel.

Career
In 1907, he succeeded William Ahlwardt as professor at the University of Greifswald, and in 1917, became professor in Göttingen as successor to Enno Littmann. From 1912, he was a corresponding member, and in 1918, a full member of the Göttingen Academy of Sciences.

Lidzbarski Prize
The Lidzbarski Gold Medal for Semitic Philology is awarded annually by the German Oriental Society for work in Semitic studies and named after Mark Lidzbarski.

Works

 Wer ist Chadhir?, in: Zeitschrift für Assyriologie 7 (1892), 104-116
 Einige Bemerkungen zu Stumme´s Tunisischen Märchen, in: ZDMG 48 (1894), 666-670
 Zum weisen Achikar, in: ZDMG 48 (1894), 671-675
 Geschichten und Lieder aus den neu-aramäischen Handschriften der Königlichen Bibliothek zu Berlin, Weimar: Emil Felber 1896 (= Beiträge zur Volks- und Völkerkunde IV)
 Eine angeblich neuentdeckte Rezension von 1001 Nacht, in: ZDMG 50 (1896), 152
 Ein Exposé der Jesiden, in: ZDMG 51 (1897), 592-604
 Handbuch der nordsemitischen Epigraphik nebst ausgewählten Inschriften, I. Teil: Text, Weimar 1898 (ND Hildesheim: Georg Olms 1962)
 Handbuch der nordsemitischen Epigraphik nebst ausgewählten Inschriften, II. Teil: Tafeln, Weimar 1898 (ND Hildesheim: Georg Olms 1962)
 Ephemeris für semitische Epigraphik
 Eerster Band 1900-1902, Gießen: J. Ricker'sche Verlagsbuchhandlung 1902
 Zweiter Band 1903-1907, Gießen: Alfred Töpelmann 1908
 Dritter Band 1903-1907, Gießen: Alfred Töpelmann 1915
 Altsemitische Texte, erstes Heft: Kanaanäische Inschriften (Moabitisch, Althebräisch, Phönizisch, Punisch), Gießen: Alfred Töpelmann 1907
 Das mandäische Seelenbuch, in: ZDMG 61 (1907), 689-698
 Sabäisch „Orakel“, in: ZDMG 67 (1913), 182
 Das Johannesbuch der Mandäer. Einleitung, Übersetzung, Kommentar, Gießen: Alfred Töpelmann 1915
 Ubi sunt qui ante nos in mundo fuere, in: Der Islam 8 (1918), 300
 Ein Desideratum, in: Der Islam 8 (1918), 300-301
 Zu arabisch fahhar, in: ZDMG 72 (1918), 189-192
 Mandäische Liturgien. Mitgeteilt, übersetzt und erklärt, Berlín 1920 (= Abhandlungen d. königl. Ges. d. Wiss. zu Göttingen, phil.-hist. Kl. NF XVII, 1) (archive.org)
 Altaramäische Urkunden aus Assur, Leipzig: J.C. Hinrichs'sche Buchhandlung 1921 (Ausgrabungen der Deutschen Orient-Gesellschaft in Assur, E: Inschriften V) (ND Osnabrück: Otto Zeller 1970)
 Salam und Islam, in: Zeitschrift für Semitistik und verwandte Gebiete 1 (1922), 85-96
 Ginza. Der Schatz oder Das große Buch der Mandäer, Göttingen: Vandenhoek & Ruprecht/Leipzig: J.C. Hinrichs'sche Buchhandlung 1925

References

 Walter Bauer: "Mark Lidzbarski zum Gedächtnis". In: Nachrichten der Gesellschaft der Wissenschaften zu Göttingen. Geschäftliche Mitteilungen 1928/29. pp. 71–77.

1868 births
1928 deaths
Writers from Płock
Humboldt University of Berlin alumni
Academic staff of the University of Greifswald
Academic staff of the University of Göttingen
Converts to Protestantism from Judaism
Scholars of Mandaeism
German people of Polish-Jewish descent
Translators from Mandaic
Translators to German